Covid Act Now (CAN) is an independent, 501(c)3 nonprofit founded by Max Henderson, Zachary Rosen, Jonathan Kreiss-Tomkins, and Igor Kofman that provides local-level disease intelligence and data analysis on COVID-19 pandemic in the United States, both on the website and through an API.

CAN provides open-source tools, a realtime U.S. COVID risk map by state and county, which incorporates both disease prevalence and the quality of local response. Recently, the site has added vaccination eligibility and rates.

CAN assists partners ranging from local county health departments to multinational corporations in developing COVID response plans. Its API is used by many of the Fortune 500 to make data-driven reopening decisions.

Covid Act Now's modeling and data partners include Grand Rounds, a digital healthcare company, and USA Facts, an initiative launched by Steve Ballmer. 

CAN's first product was a traditional SEIR model for predicting the rate of COVID spread in the USA. The model was based on open-source code by Alison Hill, an assistant professor at the Johns Hopkins’ Institute for Computational Medicine. Rebecca Katz, a professor and director of the Georgetown Center for Global Health Science and Security, and her team have served as critical advisors.

CAN published the first version of its model on March 20, 2020. Covid Act Now's university affiliates are the Georgetown University Center for Global Health Science and Security, Stanford University Clinical Excellence Research Center, and Harvard Global Health Institute.

External links 
 Covid Act Now (CAN)

Websites about the COVID-19 pandemic
Medical websites
Open data
Internet properties established in 2020